Anastasiya Muntyanu (born 13 October 1994) is a Canadian group rhythmic gymnast. She represented her nation at international competitions.

She participated at the 2012 Summer Olympics in London. She also competed at world championships, including at the 2011 World Rhythmic Gymnastics Championships.

References

External links
http://www.gymnasticsontario.ca/anastasiya-muntyanu/
http://olympic.ca/team-canada/anastasiya-muntyanu/

1994 births
Living people
Canadian rhythmic gymnasts
Place of birth missing (living people)
Gymnasts at the 2012 Summer Olympics
Olympic gymnasts of Canada
Canadian people of Romanian descent
Canadian people of Ukrainian descent
Gymnasts at the 2011 Pan American Games
Pan American Games medalists in gymnastics
Pan American Games silver medalists for Canada
Pan American Games bronze medalists for Canada
Medalists at the 2011 Pan American Games
21st-century Canadian women